Balram Das Tandon (1 November 1927 – 14 August 2018) was an Indian politician and the Former Governor of Chhattisgarh. In his adulthood for some years he was a pracharak of the Rashtriya Swayamsevak Sangh (RSS), and a leader of Bharatiya Janata Party from Punjab.

Political career
He was deputy chief minister in  the Justice (retd) Gurnam Singh Akali Dal-Jan Sangh ministry in 1969-70. He also served as cabinet minister in 1977-79 and in 1997–2002 in the ministries headed by Parkash Singh Badal. Tandon was a founding member of the Jan Sangh in 1951, and served as secretary of Punjab Jan Sangh from 1951 to 1957, and as president of the Punjab BJP from 1995 to 1997. He was elected to Punjab Legislative Assembly six times — five times from Amritsar in 1960,1962,1967,1969, and 1977, and once from Rajpura in 1997. He contested the Rajpura seat in 2002, but lost to Raj Khurana of the Indian National Congress. He was imprisoned in 1975 during the Emergency for 19 months. On 14 July 2014 he was named as the next Governor of Chhattisgarh.

Family life
Tandon married Brijpal, who was also an activist in the freedom movement, in 1958. They had two daughters, Alka Kawatra and Poonam Batra, who reside in New Delhi, and one son, Sanjay Tandon, who is also part of the political framework for BJP, Chandigarh.

References

|-

1927 births
2018 deaths
Punjabi people
Politicians from Amritsar
State cabinet ministers of Punjab, India
Bharatiya Jana Sangh politicians
Governors of Chhattisgarh
Indians imprisoned during the Emergency (India)
Deputy chief ministers of Punjab, India
Rashtriya Swayamsevak Sangh pracharaks
Bharatiya Janata Party politicians from Punjab
Punjab, India MLAs 1957–1962
Punjab, India MLAs 1962–1967
Punjab, India MLAs 1967–1972
Punjab, India MLAs 1977–1980
Punjab, India MLAs 1997–2002